Hatsumi Dam is a gravity dam located in Shimane Prefecture in Japan. The dam is used for flood control. The catchment area of the dam is 13.5 km2. The dam impounds about 24  ha of land when full and can store 3720 thousand cubic meters of water. The construction of the dam was done during 1973.

References

Dams in Shimane Prefecture
1973 establishments in Japan